Anstisia lutea is a species of frog in the family Myobatrachidae. It is sometimes named for the nearby towns, thus the Nornalup or Walpole frog.
It is endemic to Southwest Australia, along with the other members of the genus Anstisia. It was formerly classified in the genus Geocrinia, but was reclassified into the new genus Anstisia in 2022.

It is threatened by habitat loss and an altered fire regime, this and other factors contributed to the 2004 reassessment as Near Threatened (NT).
The habit, appearance and ecology is similar to that of the karri frog (A. rosea).

References

Amphibians described in 1963
Amphibians of Western Australia
Frogs of Australia
Anstisia
Taxonomy articles created by Polbot
Endemic fauna of Southwest Australia
Warren bioregion